Littlemoor is a small village near the town of Chesterfield.  Its population is around 100. It is the closest village to Ashover Rock (otherwise known as the Fabrick), Ashover. Every year, near Christmas time carol singing takes place in the village green. There is an old chapel in the centre of the village which is now a holiday home. The houses in Littlemoor are a mix of mostly bungalows and semi-detached houses.

External links

Elections 
As Littlemoor is located in the Ashover ward for the North East Derbyshire Borough Council, the village takes part in Borough elections. The results from 2019 were a Conservative Victory.
Villages in Derbyshire
Towns and villages of the Peak District
North East Derbyshire District